Al Bandari bint Abdul Rahman Al Saud (Arabic البندري بنت عبد الرحمن الفيصل آل سعود; died 15 March 2019) was a Saudi woman who was a member of the Saudi royal family. She was a well-known philanthropist and the director of King Khalid Foundation. She also held several posts in charitable organizations and non-governmental organizations in Saudi Arabia.

Early life and education
Al Bandari was a granddaughter of two Saudi kings: King Faisal (r. 1964-1975) was her paternal grandfather and King Khalid (r. 1975-1982) was her maternal grandfather. Her parents were Prince Abdul Rahman and Princess Moudi. Al Bandari had two siblings, Princess Sara and Prince Saud.

She received a bachelor's degree in English literature from King Saud University. She also obtained a master's degree in public policy from Harvard University's John F. Kennedy School of Government in 1998.

Career and activities
Al Bandari served as the director of King Khalid Foundation from its inception to her death in March 2019. She cofounded the Shaghaf programme and was a member of the Women's Charity Association, Ifta Society for Hyperactivity Disorder and the Al Nahda Philanthropic Society for Women. She collaborated with the Bill and Melinda Gates Foundation in the establishment of the Shaghaf programme, a fellowship programme, in which young Saudis are enrolled in a fifteen-month training programme to be educated as non-profit leaders in Saudi Arabia. Her another initiative was Princess Al Bandari Al Faisal Fellowship at her alma mater, the Kennedy School, which was founded to contribute to students from the Arab League. She was also a member of the TAKREEM jury board.

Through King Khalid Foundation Al Bandari bint Abdul Rahman initiated the 'No More Abuse' campaign in 2013 which is the first movement against domestic abuse in Saudi Arabia. One of the outcomes of the campaign was the passing of a law on the prevention of the women and child abuse which was drafted by the Foundation.

Personal life and death
Al Bandari married Fahd Al Damer with whom she had two daughters, Luluwah and Hana.

Al Bandari bint Abdul Rahman died on 15 March 2019. Funeral prayers were held for her following the Asr prayer at the Imam Turki bin Abdullah Mosque in Riyadh next day. Various leaders sent cables to Saudi King Salman to convey their condolences, including Oman ruler Sultan Qaboos, UAE President Sheikh Khalifa bin Zayed Al Nahyan, Vice President and Prime Minister Sheikh Mohammed bin Rashid Al Maktoum, Abu Dhabi Crown Prince Sheikh Mohammed bin Zayed Al Nahyan and Bahraini Crown Prince Salman bin Hamad Al Khalifa.

References

Al Bandari
Al Bandari
2019 deaths
Al Bandari
Harvard Kennedy School alumni
Al Bandari
Saudi Arabian princesses
Al Bandari
Al Bandari
Year of birth missing
Women philanthropists